The men's K-1 500 metres event was an individual kayaking event conducted as part of the Canoeing at the 1984 Summer Olympics program.

Medalists

Results

Heats
The 19 competitors first raced in three heats on August 6. The top three finishers from each of the heats advanced directly to the semifinals with the rest competing in the repechages.

Repechages
Taking place on August 6, the top four finishers from each repechage advanced to the semifinals.

Semifinals
The top three finishers in each of the three semifinals (raced on August 8) advanced to the final.

Final
The final was held on August 10.

References
1984 Summer Olympics official report Volume 2, Part 2. pp. 364–5. 
Sports-reference.com 1984 men's K-1 500 m results

Men's K-1 500
Men's events at the 1984 Summer Olympics